On the Threshold is a 1984 Norwegian drama film directed by Leif Erlsboe. It was entered into the 14th Moscow International Film Festival where it won a Special Prize.

Plot synopsis
An apartment house courtyard on the eastern outskirts of Oslo in the 1950s as seen through the eyes of 12-year-old Lars. His two best friends are his uncle and a prostitute who teaches him the tango.

Cast
 Magnus E. Haslund as Lars
 Joachim Calmeyer as Tobby
 Anne Krigsvoll as Lill
 Peder Hamdahl Naess as Peter
 Anne Marie Ottersen as Mor
 Frode Rasmussen as Far
 Espen Skjønberg as Kalle
 Nils Ole Oftebro as Skolelæreren
 Johan Kjelsberg as Iversen
 Grete Nordrå as Fru Lund

References

External links
 

1984 films
1984 drama films
1980s Norwegian-language films
Norwegian drama films